Donald Graham Cook (born August 13, 1946) is a retired United States Air Force four-star general who served as commander, Air Education and Training Command at Randolph Air Force Base, Texas from 2001 to 2005.

Cook entered the Air Force in 1969 through the ROTC program at Michigan State University. He completed undergraduate pilot training at Williams Air Force Base, Arizona. He has commanded a flying training wing, two space wings and the 20th Air Force. He has served as Legislative Liaison in the Senate Liaison Office, on the staff of the House Armed Services Committee, and as director for expeditionary aerospace force implementation at U.S. Air Force headquarters. Prior to assuming command of Air Education and Training Command, he was assigned to Air Combat Command as vice commander. He is a command pilot and has flown more than 3,300 hours in the B-52D/G/H, T-37B and T-38A.

After retirement, Cook was elected to the board of directors of Burlington Northern Santa Fe Corporation, Crane Corporation, HawkerBeechcraft Corporation and USAA Federal Savings Bank.

Education
1969 Bachelor of Arts degree in advertising communications, Michigan State University
1975 Squadron Officer School, Maxwell AFB, Alabama
1976 Master's degree in business administration, Southern Illinois University
1982 Armed Forces Staff College, Norfolk, Virginia
1987 Air War College, Maxwell AFB, Alabama
1996 National Security Leadership Course, Maxwell School of Citizenship and Public Affairs, Syracuse University, and School of Advanced International Studies, Johns Hopkins University

Assignments
December 1969 – December 1970, student, undergraduate pilot training, Williams AFB, Arizona
January 1971 – April 1972, T-37 instructor pilot, Webb AFB, Texas
April 1972 – March 1974, T-37 instructor pilot, Moody AFB, Georgia
March 1974 – June 1974, B-52 training, Castle AFB, California
June 1974 – June 1978, aircraft commander and instructor pilot, 2nd Bomb Squadron, later, Chief of Mission Development and Chief of Training Flight, 22nd Bomb Wing, March AFB, California
June 1978 – August 1981, resource manager, chief of special actions division, and assistant for colonel assignments, Headquarters Air Force Military Personnel Center, Randolph AFB, Texas
January 1982 – March 1984, chief of Program Evaluation Division, Deputy Chief of Staff for Plans and Programs, Headquarters Strategic Air Command, Offutt AFB, Nebraska
October 1984 – June 1986, commander, 325th Bomb Squadron, Fairchild AFB, Washington
July 1986 – June 1987, student, Air War College, Maxwell AFB, Alabama
August 1987 – November 1987, chief of Special Activities Division, Headquarters U.S. Air Force Programs and Resources, Washington, D.C.
November 1987 – November 1988, Air Force representative to the House Armed Services Committee, Washington, D.C.
November 1988 – July 1989, deputy commander for operations, 7th Bombardment Wing, Carswell AFB, Texas
July 1989 – June 1990, vice commander, 7th Bombardment Wing, Carswell AFB, Texas
June 1990 – July 1991, commander, 3415th Air Base Group, Lowry AFB, Colorado
July 1991 – July 1992, commander, 47th Flying Training Wing, Laughlin AFB, Texas
August 1992 – August 1993, chief of Senate Liaison Office, Office of the Secretary of the Air Force for Legislative Liaison, Washington, D.C.
August 1993 – January 1995, commander, 21st Space Wing, Peterson AFB, Colorado
January 1995 – August 1995, commander, 45th Space Wing, Patrick AFB, Florida
August 1995 – June 1996, director of operations, Headquarters Air Force Space Command, Peterson AFB, Colorado
June 1996 – September 1998, commander, 20th Air Force, Francis E. Warren AFB, Wyoming
September 1998 – July 1999, director for expeditionary aerospace force implementation, Deputy Chief of Staff for Air and Space Operations, Headquarters U.S. Air Force, Washington, D.C.
July 1999 – June 2000, vice commander, Air Force Space Command, Peterson AFB, Colorado
June 2000 – December 2001, vice commander, Air Combat Command, Langley AFB, Virginia
December 2001 – 2005, commander, Air Education and Training Command, Randolph Air Force Base, Texas

Flight information
Rating: Command pilot
Flight hours: More than 3,300
Aircraft flown: B-52D/G/H, T-37B and T-38A

Awards and decorations

Effective dates of promotion
Second lieutenant November 26, 1969
First lieutenant May 26, 1971
Captain November 26, 1972
Major July 1, 1981
Lieutenant colonel March 1, 1984
Colonel July 1, 1988
Brigadier general August 1, 1993
Major general September 1, 1996
Lieutenant general October 6, 1999
General December 17, 2001

Personal
Daughter Stephanie Cook Griffin, Son Christopher Cook

References

1946 births
Living people
Michigan State University alumni
Southern Illinois University alumni
Recipients of the Legion of Merit
United States Air Force generals
Recipients of the Air Force Distinguished Service Medal
Recipients of the Order of the Sword (United States)